Baron Nathan, of Churt in the County of Surrey, is a title in the Peerage of the United Kingdom. It was created on 28 June 1940 for the lawyer and politician Harry Nathan.  the title is held by his grandson, the third Baron, who succeeded his father in 2007.

Barons Nathan (1940)
Harry Louis Nathan, 1st Baron Nathan (1889–1963)
Roger Carol Michael Nathan, 2nd Baron Nathan (1922–2007)
Rupert Harry Bernard Nathan, 3rd Baron Nathan (born 26 May 1957), educated at Charterhouse School and Durham University (Hatfield College), Director of an import and export company

The heir apparent and sole heir to the title is the present holder's son, the Honourable Alasdair Harry S. Nathan (b. 1999)

References

Kidd, Charles, Williamson, David (editors). Debrett's Peerage and Baronetage (1990 edition). New York: St Martin's Press, 1990.

Baronies in the Peerage of the United Kingdom
Noble titles created in 1940
Noble titles created for UK MPs